Susan Calo-Medina was a Filipino television host, actress and writer.

Education 

Calo-Medina studied Drama in the Catholic University of America.

Career 

Calo-Medina was a marketing director of the Cultural Center of the Philippines and was a member of the Philippines'  National Commission on Culture and the Arts’ Committee on Communication.

She was the host of travel shows Tipong Pinoy and Travel Time.

Personal life

Calo-Medina was married to Juan Eulogio "Johnny" A. Medina, together they had three children: Consuelo, Marcos, and Luisa.

Accolades

Calo-Medina was awarded posthumously the Dangal ng Haraya Lifetime Achievement Award by National Commission on Culture and the Arts. She was also a posthumous recipient of a Lifetime Achievement Award by St. Scholastica's College, Manila's St. Hildegarde Awards for Women in Media.

References

External links 
  
 Documentary on Susan Calo-Medina and Travel Time

2015 deaths
Travel broadcasters
Filipino television presenters
Filipino women television presenters
Filipino stage actresses
20th-century travel writers